Gary H. McClelland is an American psychologist and professor emeritus of psychology at the University of Colorado at Boulder. His research interests focus on decision making, statistical methodologies, and economic psychology.

Education
McClelland received his Ph.D. in mathematical psychology from the University of Michigan in 1974.

References

External links
Faculty page

McClelland's page at Social Psychology Network

21st-century American psychologists
University of Colorado Boulder faculty
University of Michigan alumni
Living people
Behavioral economists
Year of birth missing (living people)